The C. L. Johnson House is a historic house located at 315 East Sessoms Avenue in Lake Wales, Florida. It is locally significant as the former home of one of the four founders of the city, and also as a fine example of a Colonial Revival style house which has experienced minimal alterations.

Description and history 
It is a two-story Colonial Revival house with a hipped roof. It has a continuous brick foundation that is 5–6 feet above grade, and features a distinctive cross shape design motif; heart pine, simple drop, horizontal board siding; and a deck hipped roof covered with asbestos tile.

It was added to the National Register of Historic Places on September 21, 1989.

References

External links
 Polk County listings at National Register of Historic Places
 Polk County listings at Florida's Office of Cultural and Historical Programs

Houses on the National Register of Historic Places in Florida
Buildings and structures in Lake Wales, Florida
National Register of Historic Places in Polk County, Florida
Houses in Polk County, Florida
Colonial Revival architecture in Florida
Houses completed in 1914